Charles Clarke (died 1750) was an English barrister, judge and politician.

Life
The son of Alured Clarke of Godmanchester in Huntingdonshire, by his second wife Ann, fourth daughter of the Rev. Charles Trimnell, rector of Ripton-Abbotts, and sister to Bishop Charles Trimnell, he was placed at Corpus Christi College, Cambridge in 1719 under his brother Alured Clarke, then a fellow of the college. Without taking a degree, he entered Lincoln's Inn in 1717, and was called to the bar in 1723.

Clarke built up a good practice as barrister, and rebuilt the family house at Godmanchester. In 1731 he was appointed recorder of Huntingdon, and in 1739 represented  in parliament. At this time he was counsel to the admiralty, and auditor of Greenwich Hospital, where he was succeeded by Heneage Legge.

On 17 May 1750 Clarke died of a fever. It was said to have been gaol distemper, caught at the Old Bailey, at the so-called "black sessions" that year. The outbreak caused the deaths of other legal figures, officials and jurymen, and was attributed to the number of prisoners and the crowd present at Captain Clark's trial for killing Captain Innes in a duel. He was buried at Godmanchester.

Family
Clarke married, first, Anne, daughter of Thomas Greene, bishop of Ely, by whom he had a son Thomas, a British Army general and secondly, Jane, daughter of Major Mullins of Winchester, by whom he had four sons including Sir Alured Clarke, lieutenant-governor of Quebec in 1792; and two daughters. His second wife survived him.

Notes

 
Attribution
 

Year of birth missing
1750 deaths
English barristers
18th-century English judges
Members of Lincoln's Inn
Alumni of Corpus Christi College, Cambridge
Members of the Parliament of Great Britain for English constituencies
British MPs 1734–1741
British MPs 1741–1747
People from Godmanchester